Sorin Roca (born 12 February 1960) is a Romanian fencer. He competed in the team foil event at the 1980 Summer Olympics.

References

1960 births
Living people
Romanian male fencers
Romanian foil fencers
Olympic fencers of Romania
Fencers at the 1980 Summer Olympics